The State of the World (SoW) was a series of books published annually from 1984 to 2017 by the U.S. based Worldwatch Institute, a thinktank that was founded in the 1970s by renowned environmentalist Lester R. Brown and ceased operations in 2017. The series attempted to identify the planet's most significant environmental challenges.

The 2010 edition discussed different ways of changing current cultures such that it felt as natural to live sustainably as living as a consumer felt at the time. The 2011 edition looked at the global food crisis and surrounding environmental and social problems, with a particular emphasis on global innovations that could help solve that worldwide problem.  The 2012 edition showcased innovative projects, creative policies, and fresh approaches that were advancing sustainable development in the twenty-first century. The 2013 edition defined the term sustainability, and assessed attempts to cultivate it.

Editions
State of the World 1984 
State of the World 1985 
State of the World 1986 
State of the World 1987 
State of the World 1988 
State of the World 1989 
State of the World 1990 
State of the World 1991 
State of the World 1992 
State of the World 1993 
State of the World 1994 
State of the World 1995 
State of the World 1996 
State of the World 1997 
State of the World 1998 
State of the World 1999 
State of the World 2000 
State of the World 2001 
State of the World 2002 
State of the World 2003 
State of the World 2004: Special Focus: The Consumer Society 
State of the World 2005: Redefining Global Security 
State of the World 2006: Special Focus: China and India 
State of the World 2007: Our Urban Future  
State of the World 2008: Innovations for a Sustainable Economy 
State of the World 2009: Into a Warming World 
State of the World 2010: Transforming Cultures: From Consumerism to Sustainability 
State of the World 2011: Innovations that Nourish the Planet 
State of the World 2012: Moving Toward Sustainable Prosperity  
The Path to Degrowth in Overdeveloped Countries, ch. 2.
State of the World 2013: Is Sustainability Still Possible? 
State of the World 2014: Governing for Sustainability 
State of the World 2015: Confronting Hidden Threats to Sustainability 
State of the World 2016: Can a City Be Sustainable? 
State of the World 2017: Earth ED: Rethinking Education on a Changing Planet

External links
  archived link at the Worldwatch Institute, last present 2019.

1984 in the environment
Series of books
Environmental non-fiction books